Tagosodes is a genus of true bugs belonging to the family Delphacidae.

The species of this genus are found in America.

Species:
 Tagosodes baina (Ding & Kuoh, 1981) 
 Tagosodes candiope (Fennah, 1975)

References

Delphacidae